Sphegina orientalis is a species of hoverfly in the family Syrphidae.

Distribution
Philippines, Taiwan.

References

Eristalinae
Insects described in 1914
Diptera of Asia
Taxa named by Kálmán Kertész